All For One Caribbean 2013 was the first edition of All For One Caribbean. The contest was held on October 21 with a total of 9 countries taking part in the inaugural contest. The winner of the competition won $5,000 and the Jeff Joseph Trophy. The singers that participated in the contest were selected by the Ministry of Tourism or Professional Musician Association of their respective countries.

Format
The competition consists of one final, the singers from each country performs two songs, the first song must not exceed 80 beats minute and the second song should be less than 120 beats per minute in tempo, the song should reflect the musical style of their country. The voting is done by one juror from each of the participating countries, the jurors score out of a total of 100 points and are not able to vote for their own country.

Final
The final took place on October 21:

Jury members
The following were the members of the jury for their respective nation:
  Barbados – Ron David
  Cuba – Gloria Occhoa
  Dominica – Marie McCarthy
  Dominican Republic – Andrea Medina
  Haiti – Melina Sanders
  Martinique – David Rodap
  Saint Martin – Maliana Maxwell 
  Saint Lucia – Carmy Joseph
  Trinidad & Tobago – Trycia Moore

International broadcasting
Each of the participating islands is not represented by a national broadcaster, it is broadcast regionally on Caribvision as well as the following national channels:
  Martinique – Martinique 1
  Saint Martin – MSR TV

References

2013 in the Caribbean
2013 in music